The 1794–95 United States Senate elections were held on various dates in various states. As these U.S. Senate elections were prior to the ratification of the Seventeenth Amendment in 1913, senators were chosen by state legislatures. Senators were elected over a wide range of time throughout 1794 and 1795, and a seat may have been filled months late or remained vacant due to legislative deadlock. In these elections, terms were up for the senators in Class 3.

This was the first election cycle with organized political parties in the United States, with the Federalist Party emerging from the Pro Administration coalition, and the Democratic-Republican Party emerging from the Anti-Administration coalition.

Results summary 
Senate party division, 4th Congress (1795–1797)

 Majority party: Federalist (20)
 Minority party: Democratic-Republican (10)
 Other parties: 0
 Total seats: 30

Change in composition

Before the elections 
Note: There were no political parties in the 3rd Congress. Members are informally grouped here into factions of similar interest, based on an analysis of their voting record.

After the March 31, 1794 special election in Pennsylvania.

Results of the elections

Beginning of the next Congress 
Seven senators who were considered "Anti-Administration" became Democratic-Republicans and eleven "Pro-Administration" became Federalists.

Race summaries 
Except if/when noted, the number following candidates is the whole number vote(s), not a percentage.

Special elections during the 3rd Congress 
In these special elections, the winner was seated before March 4, 1795; ordered by election date.

Races leading to the 4th Congress 
In these regular elections, the winner was seated on March 4, 1795; ordered by state.

All of the elections involved the Class 3 seats.

Elections during the 4th Congress 
There were no elections in 1795 after March 4.

Connecticut

Delaware (special) 

The Delaware special election was held February 7, 1795. Incumbent Senator George Read had resigned to take the position of Chief Justice of the Delaware Supreme Court. Henry Latimer defeated the former Governor of Delaware, Governor of Pennsylvania and Continental Congressmen from Delaware and Pennsylvania by one vote.

Georgia

Kentucky

Maryland 

John Henry won election over James Lloyd by an unknown amount of votes for the Class 3 seat.

New Hampshire

New York

North Carolina

Pennsylvania

Pennsylvania (special)

Pennsylvania (regular) 

Incumbent Federalist Robert Morris, who was elected in  1788, was not a candidate for re-election to another term. The Pennsylvania General Assembly convened on February 26, 1795, to elect a senator for the term beginning March 4, 1795.

South Carolina

Vermont

Virginia 

Even though neither of Virginia's incumbent's terms were up, both resigned in 1794, leading to two special elections.

Future-president James Monroe resigned March 27, 1794 to become U.S. Minister to France.

Stevens Thomson Mason was elected November 18, 1794 and would become a Democratic-Republican in the next Congress.

Virginia (special, class 2) 

Incumbent John Taylor of Caroline resigned May 11, 1794.

Henry Tazewell was elected November 18, 1794 and would become a Democratic-Republican in the next Congress.

See also
 1794 United States elections
 1794–95 United States House of Representatives elections
 3rd United States Congress
 4th United States Congress

References

External links